Arthur Isiko is an accountant and bank executive in Uganda. He is the Managing Director and Chief Executive Officer of Bank of Africa in Uganda.

Background and education
He was born at Mulago Hospital, Kampala, Uganda, in 1977. He studied commerce at Makerere University, graduating with a Bachelor of Commerce degree. He followed that with a Master of Business Administration degree obtained from the University of Warwick. Later, he obtained the title of Fellow of Chartered Certified Accountants from the Association of Chartered Certified Accountants of the United Kingdom.

Career
He joined Bank of Africa - Uganda in 2003 as Head of  Internal Audit. Later, he served as Head of Finance and then as Assistant General Manager in charge of the bank's back office operations. He was subsequently promoted to  Executive Director. In 2015, he was appointed Managing Director, having served in that position in acting capacity since 2014. From 1999 until 2003, he worked at PricewaterhouseCoopers.

See also
List of banks in Uganda
Banking in Uganda

References

External links
 Website of Bank of Africa In Uganda

Living people
1969 births
Ugandan businesspeople
Ugandan accountants
Ugandan bankers
Makerere University alumni
Alumni of the University of Warwick
Ugandan chief executives
Ugandan business executives
People from Jinja District
People from Eastern Region, Uganda